Nathan Sosa is an American attorney and politician serving as a member of the Oregon House of Representatives from the 30th district. He assumed office on February 1, 2022.

Early life and education 
Sosa was raised by his single mother in Las Vegas. When he was 16, he began working at Safeway to help financially support his family. He earned a Bachelor of Arts degree in history from the University of Nevada, Las Vegas and a Juris Doctor from the William S. Boyd School of Law at UNLV.

Career 
From 2009 to 2014, Sosa worked as an associate attorney at Wright & Weiner. From 2014 to 2018, he was an associate attorney at Corbridge Law Offices P.C. Since 2018, he has worked as an attorney at Vames & Wang in Hillsboro, Oregon. In February 2022, he was appointed to the Oregon House of Representatives by the Washington County Board of Commissioners.

References 

Living people
People from Las Vegas
University of Nevada, Las Vegas alumni
William S. Boyd School of Law alumni
Nevada lawyers
Oregon lawyers
Lawyers from Hillsboro, Oregon
Politicians from Hillsboro, Oregon
Democratic Party members of the Oregon House of Representatives
Hispanic and Latino American state legislators in Oregon
Year of birth missing (living people)